Lago della Vacca is a lake in the Province of Brescia, Lombardy, Italy. At an elevation of 2358 m, its surface area is 0.256 km².

Lakes of Lombardy